10 Aquilae (abbreviated 10 Aql) is a star in the equatorial constellation of Aquila. 10 Aquilae is the Flamsteed designation. It has an apparent visual magnitude of 5.9 and thus is a faint star that is just visible to the naked eye in dark skies. The brightness of this star is diminished by 0.17 in visual magnitude from extinction caused by interstellar gas and dust.

The outer envelope of this star has an effective temperature of 7,550 K, giving it the yellow-white hued glow of an F-type star. It is a type of chemically peculiar star known as an Ap star, as indicated by the 'p' in the stellar classification.

10 Aql was described as a variable star in 1973 and a period of six days was suggested.  Its small amplitude, period, chemical peculiarity, and position in the H–R diagram indicated that it may be an α2 CVn variable and it was given this classification in the General Catalogue of Variable Stars, along with the variable star designation V1286 Aquilae.  Later studies showed that the period was spurious and several very short pulsation periods were found: 11.6, 12.0, and 13.4 minutes.  This indicated that 10 Aql was a member of the new rapidly oscillating Ap star class.

References

External links
 HR 7167
 Image 10 Aquilae

176232
Aquila (constellation)
Aquilae, 10
Rapidly oscillating Ap stars
A-type main-sequence stars
Aquilae, V1286
Ap stars
7167
093179
Durchmusterung objects